Dragoș Mihail "Norman" Mihalache (born 25 June 1975) is a Romanian retired football player. He was the manager of Petrolistul Boldești from June 2008 until November 2009, when he was fired. Mihalache also trained CS Ștefănești in 2011.

References

External links
 
 
 
 
 

1975 births
Living people
Sportspeople from Ploiești
Romanian footballers
Association football forwards
Liga I players
FC Petrolul Ploiești players
ASC Oțelul Galați players
FC Astra Giurgiu players
Liga II players
CSM Flacăra Moreni players
CS Gaz Metan Mediaș players
Cypriot First Division players
APOP Kinyras FC players
Romanian expatriate footballers
Romanian expatriate sportspeople in Cyprus
Expatriate footballers in Cyprus
Romanian football managers